Hunter-Trader-Trapper was an American outdoors magazine created by Arthur Robert Harding. It ran from 1900 to 1938. The magazine was published first in Gallia County, Ohio, and then in Columbus, Ohio. In 1919 the publishers were F. J. and W. F Heer, the business manager was W. F. Heer, and the managing editor was Otto Kuechler.

See also
Huntin' Fool, since 1995 monthly magazine for big game hunting in Western United States

References

1900 establishments in Ohio
1938 disestablishments in Ohio
Lifestyle magazines published in the United States
Defunct magazines published in the United States
Hunting and fishing magazines
Magazines established in 1900
Magazines disestablished in 1938
Magazines published in Ohio
Mass media in Columbus, Ohio